Khemara Keila FC was a Cambodian football club based in Phnom Penh, Cambodia.

History 
The club was established in 1997. The name is derived from Khemara a formal term for Khmer, and keila meaning sports. The club won 2005 and 2006 the Metfone C-League, as well 2007 the Hun Sen Cup. Due to financial problems and the mass exodus of key players, the club withdraw from Hun Sen Cup 2011 and later also from Metfone C-League 2011 and was defunct 2011.

Performance
Metfone C-League: 2
2005, 2006
Hun Sen Cup: 1
 2007

AFC President's Cup
Semi-finalist: 2006

In AFC competitions
AFC President's Cup: 2 appearances
2006: Semi-final
2007: Group stage

External links

Football clubs in Cambodia
Association football clubs established in 1997
Sport in Phnom Penh
1997 establishments in Cambodia
Association football clubs disestablished in 2011
2011 disestablishments in Cambodia